The Vreeland House is located in Leonia, Bergen County, New Jersey, United States. The house was built in 1786 by Dirck Vreeland. His son Michael D. Vreeland, added the main Dutch style wing of the house in 1815. The house remained in the Vreeland family until 1928. The house was added to the National Register of Historic Places on November 17, 1978.

See also

 National Register of Historic Places listings in Bergen County, New Jersey
 English Neighborhood

References

External links

Library of Congress link to Vreeland House

Houses completed in 1786
Houses on the National Register of Historic Places in New Jersey
Houses in Bergen County, New Jersey
Leonia, New Jersey
National Register of Historic Places in Bergen County, New Jersey
Historic American Buildings Survey in New Jersey
New Jersey Register of Historic Places